Gurudayal Government College or Gurudayal College is a public tertiary higher education institution. It is affiliated to the National University in Bangladesh. The college is located in Kishoreganj, Bangladesh. The college was founded in 1943

The college has its campus on 22.72 acre of land. As of 2021, it had 22,000 students. The college offers higher secondary education, undergraduate (three-year bachelor pass and four-year bachelor's honours), and graduate (master's) level education to students. Undergraduate and graduate level education is imparted in four key areas: arts, commerce, science, and social science. Undergraduate honour's level education are offered in sixteen disciplines: Bangla; English; history; Islamic history and culture; philosophy; political science; economics; accounting; management; physics; chemistry; botany; zoology; geography and environment; and mathematics.

Academics 
As of June 2022, the college had a total of 163 academic positions: 16 professors, 32 associate professor, 47 assistant professor, and 66 lecturer positions. The academics are selected by the Bangladesh Public Service Commission, and  appointed by the government of Bangladesh (Ministry of Public Administration) as a member of Bangladesh Civil Service (General Education) Cadre Service. The conditions of the service and related other matters are managed by the  Directorate of Secondary and Higher Education (DSHE), and the Secondary and Higher Education Division (SHED).

Notable alumni 
 Justice Shahabuddin Ahmed, Former President of Bangladesh, 1996-2001
 Abdul Hamid, 16th President of Bangladesh
 Amir Hossain, justice of the Supreme Court of Bangladesh
 Rashida Hamid is a Bangladeshi teacher, public figure, and First Lady of Bangladesh. She is the wife of the President Abdul Hamid

See also 
 Pakundia Adarsha Mohila College
 Shahid Syed Nazrul Islam Medical College

References

Colleges affiliated to National University, Bangladesh
Educational institutions established in 1943
Universities and colleges in Bangladesh
1943 establishments in India
Colleges in Kishoreganj District